The International Study Group on Music Archaeology (ISGMA) is a study group of researchers who carry out research in the field of music archaeology.

References

Ancient music
Organizations established in 1998